Shawn Decker (born July 16, 1975, in Waynesboro, Virginia) was diagnosed with HIV at age 11, through the use of tainted blood products used to treat hemophilia, a bleeding disorder that he was born with.  In 1996, he posted a web site called "My Pet Virus", writing humorous articles about himself and blogging about life with HIV.  He befriended fellow "poz blogger" Steve Schalchlin, as well as POZ magazine, who turned his blog into a regular column the following year, called "Positoid", a word that Decker made up to describe himself as someone living with HIV.

His memoir, My Pet Virus, The True Story of a Rebel Without a Cure was published in 2006.

References

Living people
1975 births
People with HIV/AIDS
Recipients of contaminated haemophilia blood products
American columnists
People from Waynesboro, Virginia
Journalists from Virginia